Fifth Avenue Girl, sometimes stylized as 5th Ave Girl, is a 1939 RKO Radio Pictures comedy film directed by Gregory La Cava and starring Ginger Rogers, Walter Connolly, Verree Teasdale, and James Ellison. The screenplay was written by Allan Scott with uncredited contributions by La Cava and Morris Ryskind.

The film is about a rich industrialist with business problems who feels neglected by his family and hires a young woman to stir things up.

Plot
Wealthy industrialist Alfred Borden has problems both at work and at home. His employees at Amalgamated Pump are making demands that may drive the business that he has built from nothing into bankruptcy. His son Tim, who prefers playing polo, has neglected and lost a major customer. On his birthday, when Alfred returns to his Fifth Avenue mansion, he finds nobody there but the servants. His unfaithful wife Martha, his daughter Katherine and Tim have all forgotten, are busy or do not care.

Feeling lonely, Alfred takes the advice of his butler and visits Central Park, where he meets Mary Grey, a young unemployed woman. He invites her to dine with him at a fancy nightclub. They get drunk, dance and are spotted by a friend of Alfred's wife. The next morning, he wakes with a hangover and a black eye, discovering that he had invited Mary to spend the night in a guest room.

Seeing the reaction this elicits from his formerly indifferent family, he hires Mary to pretend to be his mistress. He neglects his company, forcing his son to take up the slack, and Tim develops fresh new ideas to save the firm. Alfred and Mary go out every night, pretending to cavort for hours, although they are actually driven around by the ardently communist chauffeur Mike, whom Katherine loves.

Embarrassed by the newspaper gossip columns and shunned by her friends, Martha consults a psychiatrist who finds nothing wrong with her suddenly cheerful and carefree husband. She starts staying home, plotting ways to drive Mary away. Tim, who shows contempt for Mary, unsuccessfully tries to buy her off and eventually falls in love with her. Mary tries to help Katherine with Mike, who does not pay any attention to her. Finally, Martha tries to convince Mary that she has surrendered and that they should all be friends.

In Central Park, Tim kisses Mary, who is upset the next day and wants to leave but is confronted by Tim. Martha and Alfred dine together in the kitchen, which reminds them of when they were young and poor. They page through old photographs, reminiscing about their life together.

Katherine announces that she has married Mike, who has decided to quit and open a repair shop. Martha is aghast, but Alfred reminds her that they had started their own marriage in a similar fashion, and she grudgingly accepts her new son-in-law. When Mary and Tim enter, Alfred feigns rage, but Mary can no longer continue with the charade and tearfully confesses the truth about her arrangement with Alfred. When she leaves, Tim chases her and carries her back into the mansion. When a policeman tries to interfere, Mary tells him to mind his own business.

Cast

 Ginger Rogers as Mary Grey
 Walter Connolly as Alfred Borden
 Verree Teasdale as Martha Borden
 James Ellison as Mike
 Tim Holt as Tim Borden
 Kathryn Adams as Katherine Borden
 Franklin Pangborn as Higgins, the butler
 Ferike Boros as Olga, a maid
 Louis Calhern as Dr. Hugo Kessler
 Theodore von Eltz as Terwilliger
 Alexander D'Arcy as Maitre D'

Cast notes:
 Jack Carson has a small part as a sailor singing to his girl in Central Park.

Production
Production on Fifth Avenue Girl took place from May 20 to June 28, 1939. Retakes took place on August 9, 1939. Principal photography was completed 12 days earlier than scheduled. Working titles for the film were My Fifth Avenue Girl and The Other Half.

Louis Calhern, who plays Dr. Kessler, was originally slated to play the role of Tommy Hopkins that was taken by Cornelius Keefe.

The film as presented to preview audiences included a different, unhappy ending with Mary leaving the house and walking down Fifth Avenue. According to Ginger Rogers' autobiography Ginger: My Story, Rogers vacationed in Honolulu after the filming of Fifth Avenue Girl. A new ending was shot when she returned.

Reception
The New York Times critic Frank Nugent described the film as "cheerful and cheerfully unimportant. It may not be a strikingly good comedy, but then it isn't militantly bad either."

The film was a box-office hit and earned a profit of $314,000.

Radio adaptations
Fifth Avenue Girl was presented on Lux Radio Theater in 1940, starring Ginger Rogers and Edward Arnold. Another version was presented on Hollywood Players on January 1, 1947, with Paulette Goddard playing Mary Gray.

References

External links
 
 
 
 

1939 films
1939 romantic comedy films
American black-and-white films
American romantic comedy films
Films directed by Gregory La Cava
Films set in New York City
RKO Pictures films
1930s English-language films
1930s American films